Cottunculus spinosus is a species of fish in the family Psychrolutidae (blobfishes) found in the Southeast Atlantic Ocean.

References

spinosus
Fish described in 1906
Taxa named by John Dow Fisher Gilchrist
Fish of the North Atlantic